The Arab–Israeli conflict is the result of numerous factors. Reasons cited for the conflict therefore vary from participant to participant and observer to observer. A powerful example of this divide can be Palestinians and Israelis. In a March, 2005 poll 63% of the Israelis blamed the failure of the Oslo Peace Process on Palestinian violence, but only 5% of the Palestinians agreed. 54% of Palestinians put the blame on continuing Israeli settlement activity, but only 20% of the Israelis agreed. It is therefore difficult to develop a single, objective reason for the conflict, so this article will present some of the arguments made by each side, in turn.

Israeli views
There is not a single "Israeli view"; there are many different Israeli views, which differ widely.

Israeli peace offers
When Israel met Arab leaders who spoke the language of peace to their own people and were willing to take concrete steps for peace, such as President Sadat of Egypt and King Hussein of Jordan, Israel made sacrifices for the sake of peace and reached peace agreements with them. Peacemaking requires concessions and confidence-building measures on both sides. Just as Israel is willing to address the rights and interests of other parties in the conflict, Israelis insist that their rights and interests must be addressed as well.

In 2000, at Camp David, the Palestinians were offered a nominally independent state. Led by Yasser Arafat, the Palestinians rejected this offer. When U.S. President Bill Clinton and the Israelis asked the Palestinians to offer a counter-proposal, Arafat declined and returned to the West Bank. Later, further negotiations did take place, but they were terminated. In his book The Missing Peace: The Inside Story of the Fight for Middle East Peace, Dennis Ross, the American ambassador and facilitator, writes that the idea the Palestinian state would be a "Bantustan" was a myth, and provides maps showing an offer that included contiguous territory.

Arab peace offers
The Palestine Liberation Organization (PLO) has stated that it is prepared to recognize the state of Israel on the basis of the removal of settlements and retreat from Palestinian territory back to the 1967 borders. Israel maintains that Hamas refuses to recognize Israel, on grounds that Hamas's 'peace offerings' are a ploy.

Arab hostility
Many if not most Israelis believe that the conflict is largely a result of Arab attempts to destroy Israel, and that only Israeli military power stands between them and annihilation. They characterize the 1948 Arab–Israeli War, the Six-Day War and the Yom Kippur War as attempts to destroy Israel. As evidence of this intent, pro-Israeli literature often places a heavy emphasis on statements made by Arab leaders during and preceding the wars. The following quotes are mainstays of these arguments:
 "If Israel embarks on an aggression against Syria or Egypt. ... The battle will be a general one and our basic objective will be to destroy Israel." (Gamal Abdel Nasser's speech to Arab Trade Unionists, May 26, 1967)
 On May 30, 1967, Nasser proclaimed: "The armies of Egypt, Jordan, Syria and Lebanon are poised on the borders of Israel ... to face the challenge, while standing behind us are the armies of Iraq, Algeria, Kuwait, Sudan and the whole Arab nation. This act will astound the world. Today they will know that the Arabs are arranged for battle, the critical hour has arrived. We have reached the stage of serious action and not declarations." (Isi Leibler, The Case For Israel, 1972, p. 60.) After Iraq joined the Arab military alliance on June 4, its president Abdur Rahman Aref announced: "The existence of Israel is an error which must be rectified. This is our opportunity to wipe out the ignominy which has been with us since 1948. Our goal is clear – to wipe Israel off the map." (Leibler, p. 18)

Israel chooses to fight in self-defense
SC 242, the Land for peace formula, was adopted on November 22, 1967 in the aftermath of the Six-Day War and the Khartoum Resolution. It called for withdrawal from occupied territories and for "termination of all claims or states of belligerency" and mutual "acknowledgment of the sovereignty, territorial integrity and political independence" by Israel and the other states in the area, and recognized the right of "every state in the area" to live "free from threats or acts of force" within "secure and recognized boundaries".

Immediately after the Six-Day War, Israel offered to return the Golan Heights to Syria and the Sinai Peninsula (including the Gaza Strip) to Egypt in exchange for peace treaties and various concessions, but Syria and Egypt refused the offer and this offer of land for peace was very soon withdrawn. Anwar Sadat, the Egyptian President at the time, proposed negotiations towards peace with Israel in the early 1970s but Israel refused the offer, claiming that it held unreasonable preconditions. Later Israel signed the Camp David Accords (1978) with Egypt and subsequently withdrew from all Egyptian territory it occupied.

Many, including the original framers of the resolution, have noted that the English-language version of SC 242 did not state all territories occupied during the conflict, recognizing that some territorial adjustments were likely and rejected previous drafts with the word all (see UN Security Council Resolution 242). The French language translation of the text did include the definite article. Israel considers it has complied with this sense of the resolution when it returned the Sinai to Egypt in 1982.

Israel has no partner for peace
Israel says that it has demonstrated flexibility and understanding by bringing about the initiation of the peace process, agreeing to painful concessions, and partially implementing them. As opposed to this, many Israelis consider that the predominant Palestinian views of the peace process do not recognize Israel's right to exist, and believe that the only real long-term Arab goal is the complete destruction of the Jewish state.

Non-recognition of Israel's right to exist and non-recognition of democratically elected Hamas
Many Jews and supporters of Israel, and most Palestinians and supporters of Palestine, take the view that the very existence of the state of Israel is at stake. Most of the other parties to the dispute maintain formally that Israel should be recognized as a state, although some consider that it should be abolished. Some opponents of Israel do not even acknowledge its existence, refusing any contact with or mention of it, and instead describing it as "The Zionist Entity" with outdated land claims. On the other hand, Hamas was democratically elected to govern in Gaza, although they are regarded as a terrorist organisation by Israel. It can be claimed that by refusing to recognise the democratically elected government of Gaza, Israel can effectively prevent meaningful peace negotiations indefinitely.

Israelis argue that the continued Jewish presence in the area throughout the past three millennia, and the deep religious ties maintained by Judaism with the Land of Israel, give Jews a continuing and valid claim. Although the 1800 years preceding the establishment of Israel saw limited Jewish presence, they emphasize that the destruction of the Kingdom of Israel and Jewish Diaspora were due to foreign conquests. They also point out that since antiquity, Jewish beliefs were frequently branded as "obsolete" (see Against Apion, Supersessionism). It may also be noted that historical grounds are not the only reasons given for the establishment of a Jewish state.

Israelis regard many of the Arab criticisms against the state of Israel as threats to the state's existence, and say that against the multitude and power of the Arab states, there is only one Jewish state, which, they feel, should behave vigilantly, and assert its power in both a defensive and preemptive manner as deemed necessary.

Issues of democracy and fairness

Treatment of Jews in Arab-ruled societies and vice versa

Some Israelis point to issues of unfair and prejudicial treatment of Jews in Arab-ruled societies historically and currently. Israelis say that Arab countries such as Syria and Yemen do not give full rights and freedoms to Jews, and others (such as Saudi Arabia) do not even allow Jews to be citizens.  The United Nations Human Development Reports and human rights groups report that many Arab countries do not allow political opposition and other freedoms and lack checks and balances and separation of powers.

They also argue that within Israel, Israeli Arabs are not subject to this type of discrimination. They point to Israel's democratic system which protects the rights of Jewish and Arab Israelis alike. Within the pre-1967 armistice lines, Arab and other minorities are given freedom of religion, culture and political organization. Several Arab political parties have elected parliament members in the Knesset. Arabs are typically not conscripted into the Israeli military (though they are accepted as volunteers), so they will generally never have to fight their peoples. However, it is recognized that this can affect later job opportunities, as some jobs in Israel require previous military service.

Many Israeli Arabs, however, say that they are discriminated against, and that Israeli government agencies treat them worse than non-Arab Israelis.  In 2004, the US State Department's Country Report on Human Rights Practices indicates that Israel "did little to reduce institutional, legal, and societal discrimination against the country's Arab citizens".

Islamic vs. other views of Land ownership
Some views focus on differences in concepts of land ownership as a root source of conflict. Sharia (Islamic law) contains the concept of Waqf, revenue-generating property as religious endowment that, once established, is permanent in nature.

Under some traditional interpretations, Muslim territory encompass all land that was ever under Muslim control. The Hamas charter embraces this view of land ownership: "The Islamic Resistance Movement maintains that the land of Palestine is Waqf land given as endowment for all generations of Muslims until the Day of Resurrection. One should not neglect it or [even] a part of it, nor should one relinquish it or [even] a part of it. No Arab state, or [even] all of the Arab states [together], have [the right] to do this; no king or president has this right nor all the kings and presidents together; no organization, or all the organizations together – be they Palestinian or Arab – [have the right to do this] because Palestine is Islamic Waqf land given to all generations of Muslims until the Day of Resurrection. This is the legal status of the land of Palestine according to Islamic law. In this respect, it is like any other land that the Muslims have conquered by force, because the Muslims consecrated it at the time of the conquest as religious endowment for all generations of Muslims until the Day of Resurrection."

Also concerning the oftly quoted Hadith, "The Last hour won't occur until you (Muslims) fight the Jews and kill them." This view is not universally agreed in the Muslim world. Muslim scholars such as Abdul Hadi Palazzi, the leader of Italian Muslim Assembly, accept Israel's sovereignty over the Holy Land and Jerusalem, on condition that the rights of other religions are protected. Palazzi quotes the Qur'an to support Judaism's special connection to Israel, and claims that the Qur'an "expressly recognizes that Jerusalem plays the same role for Jews that Mecca has for Muslims".

Characterizations of Zionism as racism and colonialism
Some Arabs believe that Zionism is a racist ideology, that implies the superiority of Jews. They view Jewish immigration, from the late 19th century, as a colonization of Palestinians' land.
Most Israelis see Zionism as the desire of Jewish people to live as free people in the land of Israel, where the concept of Jewish nationhood first materialized somewhere between the 13th and 6th century BCE. They argue that Zionism does not imply the superiority of Jews over any other nationality or ethnicity, but is simply a re-establishment and realization of Jewish dreams of nationhood, autonomy, and self-determination. Religious Zionists also believe that Land of Israel was promised to Jews by God, whereas religious Muslims consider the Land of Israel to be an Islamic waqf, as it was historically conquered in the name of Islam, and should forever remain the provenance of the Islamic faith.

People of many races, colors and ethnic backgrounds live in Israel. It is pointed out that Israeli Jews come from a wide variety of ethnic backgrounds. In the 1930s, ideas of a 'population exchange' of Arabs and Jews between Arab states and Israel were actually popular among Zionists. In practice, most Jews living in Arab Nations in 1948 have currently left Arab countries: 2/3 have moved to Israel. Zionism allows Arabs, Druze, Bedouin and other non-Jews to live in Israel as well, although by most interpretations it requires a Jewish majority to be established.

While some extremist Israelis (particularly supporters of outlawed Kach party) believe in the forced transfer of Arabs from Israel, this is not a widely held view.

Zionists hold that Zionism is not colonialism, since the area was the Jewish homeland, before Romans expelled the Jews from Palestine, in the 2nd century CE. They argue that Jews have the right to return to their historical national homeland, and that living in the Diaspora restricted the full growth of Jewish individual and national life.

Refugee issues

Jewish refugees
After the establishment of the State of Israel in 1948, most of the Jewish population in Arab countries fled, were expelled, were coerced by Arab governments, or voluntarily left their homes in an increasing climate of hostility, with nearly 66% absorbed by Israel. The State of Israel reacted by encouraging and facilitating emigration of non-local Jews to Israel.  In a few Arab countries, this population change occurred over several decades and was accelerated by the promise of prosperity and acceptance in Israel. Many Jews lost much of their property and continue to claim compensation. There has since been various return invitations from Arab states although these are mostly dismissed as politically motivated attempts to discredit Israel, and virtually no resettled Jews have shown interest in returning to their former homes, as they have integrated in their new homes or fear persecution in Arab states.

According to Benny Morris, "[i]n the early years of statehood, Israeli leaders like David Ben-Gurion and Moshe Sharett viewed the flight of Palestinians and the influx of Oriental Jews as simply a 'population exchange,' akin to those between Greece and Turkey in the 1920s or India and Pakistan in 1947." Iraqi Prime Minister Nuri as-Said and other Arab leaders viewed it the same way. Many continue to view it this way. Some Palestinian refugees never accepted that a "population exchange" had occurred, though others do accept that an irrevocable population exchange has occurred.

Furthermore, Israel has charged that Palestinian refugees were neglected by most Arab nations, whereas Jewish refugees were integrated into Israeli society, and that this neglect is a contributing cause to the poverty and misery experienced by the residents of those camps.

Palestinian refugees
Israel does not recognize a Palestinian Right of Return. Property that belonged to Arabs who left or fled Israel before, during and after the 1948 Arab–Israeli War is confiscated under the Absentee Property Act.

Israel maintains that the General Assembly resolutions establishing the Right of Return are merely recommendations under International law, and in any event doubt that the refugees wish to "live in peace with their neighbors".

Jewish Israelis fear that if Palestinian refugees were allowed to return to Israel, the Jews would become a minority and Israel would no longer be a Jewish state. Many believe that if surrounding Arab states integrate the Palestinian refugees hostilities could be defused, and that the harsh treatment of refugees in Arab states is done deliberately by those states in order to keep the conflict alive.

Israel has stated that it is willing to allow a limited number of Arabs to immigrate on a humanitarian basis (such as the unification of families) and limited compensation for others in the framework of a comprehensive peace plan. Although serious discussion of how this would be implemented between both sides have yet to take place.

The text of UN Resolution 194 refer to a "just settlement of the refugee problem" and does not specifically mention either the Palestinian refugees or the Jewish refugees, nor what a "just solution" would entail. Nevertheless, this resolution is the primary basis for the concept of a "Right of Return" and is often referenced as if it were such. For example, in 2004, Resolution 59/117, the UN General Assembly "[n]otes with regret that repatriation or compensation of the refugees, as provided for in paragraph 11 of General Assembly resolution 194 (III), has not yet been effected and that, therefore, the situation of the Palestine refugees continues to be a matter of grave concern".

Settlements
Israelis typically of the political right, support settlements in the West Bank. The platform of the "Likud" party states that "settlement of the land is a clear expression of the unassailable right of the Jewish people to the Land of Israel and constitutes an important asset in the defense of the vital interests of the State of Israel."

Israelis typically of the political left oppose settlements, believing they are illegal under the Fourth Geneva Convention and/or thwart peace efforts. However, most Israelis do not view the building of houses and stores in Israeli settlements as an act of war, and believe that disputes over land do not justify violent resistance or terrorism, but that there should be politically negotiated solutions. This view is rejected by Palestinians and many outside Israel, as Israel's leadership continues to build settlements on land they contend to be Palestinian, an activity that is roundly condemned by much of the world except Israel and overlooked by the United States.

Israel's settlement supporters argue that the Fourth Geneva Convention does not technically apply to the territories, since they have no "High Contracting Party", and claim that the Convention in any event only applied to forcible transfers of populations into or out of captured territories. However, a conference of High Contracting Parties in 2001 "reaffirmed the applicability of the Fourth Geneva Convention to the Occupied Palestinian Territory, including East Jerusalem" and "they reiterated the need for full respect for the provisions of the said Convention in that Territory."

Palestinian and other Arab views
There is not a single "Arab view"; there are many different Arab views, which differ widely.  Nevertheless, Palestinian perspectives have mostly remained static throughout the conflict.

Illegitimacy or illegality of Israel
See also International law and the Arab–Israeli conflict.

Palestinians claim they have International law on their side.

UN General Assembly Resolution 181 orders that "Independent Arab and Jewish States... shall come into existence in Palestine".
Arab leaders and governments rejected the plan of partition in the resolution and indicated an unwillingness to accept any form of territorial division.[8] Their reason was that it violated the principles of national self-determination in the UN charter which granted people the right to decide their own destiny.[6] [9]
Israeli founding father and author of Resolution 181 Abba Eban claimed that Israel "tear[s] up its own birth certificate" when it ignores UN resolutions.

Palestinians hold that Israel disregards the following UN resolutions/International Law provisions:
 UN General Assembly Resolution 194 calls for "the refugees wishing to return to their homes and live at peace with their neighbours should be permitted to do so at the earliest practicable date, and that compensation should be paid for the property of those choosing not to return and for loss of or damage to property" not naming either Palestinian refugees or Jewish refugees. Palestinians hold that this resolution should allow for the Palestinian exodus to return to their homes in Israel. Israel has blocked the return of these refugees and confiscated their land as "absentee".
 UN Security Council Resolution 242, adopted after the Six-Day War, emphasizes "the inadmissibility of the acquisition of territory by war and the need to work for a just and lasting peace in which every State in the area can live in security," and calls for "withdrawal of Israel armed forces from territories occupied in the recent conflict" and for the recognition of the "sovereignty, territorial integrity and political independence of every State in the area and their right to live in peace within secure and recognized boundaries free from threats or acts of force". These territories occupied included the Gaza Strip, Golan Heights, West Bank and the Sinai Peninsula. The Palestinian Authority intends eventually to establish a state in the West Bank and Gaza Strip. Israel maintains control of the West Bank and maritime/aerospace control of the Gaza Strip.
 The Fourth Geneva Convention forbids an occupying power from confiscating occupied land and transferring its own population to that territory.
 UN Security Council Resolution 446 declares that the Israeli settlements in the occupied Palestinian territories are illegal.

Historical treatment of Jews in the Arab world

Many Muslims and contemporary western historians assert that Jews were treated better by Muslims than by other rulers who persecuted them. One pertinent example is the mass expulsion of Jews from Spain after the fall of their last refuge there, the Muslim kingdom of Granada in 1492. This resulted in the migration of Jews (especially those fleeing the Spanish Inquisition) to the Ottoman Empire, including the present-day region of Israel and surrounding areas. Authoritative works summarizing Jewish treatment within Muslim lands written by Jews have concluded that although occasional violent persecution did occur, it was not systemic nor continuous and substantially better than treatment by Christians in the pre-modern era. (Lewis, 1984)

Treatment of Palestinians
Restrictions on Palestinian movements were introduced to increase levels of security within Israel and Jewish settlements in the West Bank and Gaza.  They have been of variable severity over time. The international community often views these as punishments of the masses because of the actions of a few. This perception of unjust persecution provides a continuing rationale for hostility toward Israel.

Bulldozing of houses and destruction of infrastructure within Palestinian residential areas in the name of Israeli security add to the poor conditions and lack of opportunities for the Palestinians. This is a frequently-used point of indignation against Israel by Palestinian sympathizers.

Arab publications and others have compared Zionism to German Nazism and other historical examples of oppression and ethnic cleansing. Many Arabs, and others, believe Israel practices a form of Israeli apartheid against the Palestinian people, as bad as, or worse than, that practiced by South Africa, and that Zionism is a form of colonialism and has been carried out through extensive ethnic cleansing against the "indigenous people of Palestine", even though Jews are also indigenous to the area encompassing modern day Israel and the Palestinian Territories, and are closely related to the Palestinian Arabs. Furthermore, pro-Israel advocates reply that these claims are non-factual and the comparisons are specious, or with assertions that such claims are hypocritical, since Arabs have created twenty-two Arab states, in some of which the remaining Jews are discriminated against. Palestinians hold that the existence of other Arab nations is irrelevant; they want to have the land they owned back, rather than being forced to throw themselves on others' charity in foreign countries.

Israel's Family Reunification Law allowed the Interior Minister to grant permanent resident status to West Bank Palestinians who have family members in Israel.  A recent revision to this Law required that the Interior Minister "shall not grant" citizenship except in exceptional cases; recent additional modifications allow some citizenships, but limit based on age.  In his comment to the Knesset Interior Affairs committee on July 19, 2005, Shin Bet Chief Yuval Diskin stated that "11% of those involved in terror attacks are Palestinians who entered Israel via the Family Reunification Law."

Refugee issues
UN General Assembly Resolution 194 calls for "the refugees wishing to return to their homes and live at peace with their neighbours should be permitted to do so at the earliest practicable date, and that compensation should be paid for the property of those choosing not to return and for loss of or damage to property". Israel has blocked the return of these refugees and confiscated their land as "absentee".

The supporters of Israel argue that the return of Palestinian refugees and millions of their descendants would mean the end of Jewish self-determination and assert the historical necessity for Jews to have a safe haven. See also Jewish refugees.

Furthermore, some argue that Palestinians, if allowed to return, would not live in peace with their neighbours.

Jewish settlements in the West Bank and the Gaza Strip

There are currently 246,000 Jewish settlers living in settlements in the West Bank, not including 200,000 Israeli Jews who live in annexed East Jerusalem. Ongoing settlement development and growth are major reasons Palestinians claim the peace process has failed, and the issue figures prominently in the larger narrative of the Arab–Israeli conflict among non-Palestinian Arabs.

To monitor and control Palestinian movement, Israel has established 50+ checkpoints in and around the West Bank. As well, recently, Israel has begun construction of a controversial West Bank barrier. Palestinians complain that these measures greatly restrict their movement and are often humiliating, while Israel asserts that they are necessary for security. Palestinians also point out that Israel accelerated the expansion of settlements in the West Bank and Gaza Strip throughout the Oslo peace process.

During Fateh Central Committee meeting on September 5, 2005, "[r]eferring to the lands Israel would evacuate in Gaza Strip, President Abbas said that 97.5% of these lands were state-owned lands".
In 2005, approximately 9,000 settlers were evicted by Israel from the Gaza Strip and the West Bank.

Arab Peace Offer
In 2002, Saudi Arabia offered a peace plan in The New York Times and at a summit meeting of the Arab League in Beirut. The plan is based on, but goes beyond UN Security Council Resolution 242 and Resolution 338. It essentially calls for full withdrawal, solution of the refugee problem, and a Palestinian state with its capital in East Jerusalem in return for fully normalized relations with the whole Arab world. This proposal received the unanimous backing of the Arab League for the first time.

In response, Israeli Foreign Minister Shimon Peres said: "[T]he details of every peace plan must be discussed directly between Israel and the Palestinians, and to make this possible, the Palestinian Authority must put an end to terror, the horrifying expression of which we witnessed just last night in Netanya."

Palestinians as victims of extremism

Today, some Palestinians think that an equitable arrangement for all involved parties requires dialogue with Israelis and the international community. The PLO has officially accepted the right of Israel to exist within the pre-1967 armistice lines. However, some PLO representatives, including Yasser Arafat, have also declared at times that they saw these statements as politically necessary steps. Some observers interpret this to mean that they view the two-state solution as a stepping stone to a more integrated long-term solution. Others, particularly some Israelis, claim that these statements betray a hidden agenda and worldview where the peace process with Israel is only a temporary measure in support of the ultimate Palestinian goal, which is the destruction of the state of Israel, and presumably the eviction of its Jewish citizens. They point to the fact that the PLO never updated its formal statement of policy, the Palestinian National Covenant to reflect their recognition of the State of Israel and that it still calls for the destruction of Israel; however the U.S. Embassy in Israel is on record confirming that "On April 24, 1996, the Palestinian National Council (PNC) amended the charter by canceling the articles inconsistent with its commitments to Israel". Still, belief in an existential threat from the PLO causes alarm among much of the Israeli public.

Mutual claims

Biased text books
Many Palestinian school textbooks, including those distributed and sponsored by the Palestinian Authority since 1994, have historically minimized or ignored Jewish history of the land prior to the 20th century. Israeli textbooks and school curriculum also often ignore Palestinian history. Texts and school curriculum on both sides are accused of propagating "myths" about the history of the conflict, and relegating important points of view and facts.

The role of the superpowers
Palestinians cite many reasons for the perceived lack of support of their cause in the United States, despite the perception that it is more broadly supported in Europe. One such reason is postulated to be ethnic bigotry in the U.S.; while stereotyping of many other groups is no longer rampant, many people believe that Muslims, and Arabs in particular, continue to be vilified and victimized by crude attacks. There is also belief that American policy is largely shaped by American Jewish groups like AIPAC. It has also been argued that the U.S. continues to support Israel in order to have a strong foothold in the region for their own national interests, politically and economically. Many also cite the political nature of the Cold War that aligned the U.S. with Israel against the USSR and its allies in the region.

The USSR traditionally used Arabs as a proxy in the Cold War against the Western world (and the West's proxy in the Middle East, Israel). Some of today's anti-Zionist rhetoric still reflects the position of Soviet Zionology.

Peace and reconciliation
Despite the long history of conflict between Israelis and Arabs, there are many people working on peaceful solutions that respect the rights of peoples on all sides. See projects working for peace among Israelis and Palestinians.

Currently active List of Middle East peace proposals include:
 Geneva Accord
 Road map for peace
 The People's Voice

See also
 Arab–Israeli conflict
 Media coverage of the Arab–Israeli conflict

References

External links

Views of the Conflict: Pro-Israeli
 Myths and Facts of the Arab-Israeli Conflict, extensive collection of questions and answers with maps and documents published by the American-Israeli Cooperative Enterprise
 Arab-Israeli Conflict: Basic Facts from the Israeli Science and Technology Homepage
 10 Facts About the Arab-Israeli Conflict, a presentation of facts about the conflict that are sometimes overlooked or ignored
 Bard, Mitchell, Ph.D. (1999) Middle East Conflict. Published by Alpha Books, 201 West 103rd Street, Indianapolis, IN 46290. 
 The Associated Press (1967). Lightning Out of Israel The Arab-Israeli Conflict. Printed in the U.S.A. by Western Printing and Lithographing Company
 Dershowitz, Alan. The Case for Israel (John Wiley & Sons, 2004),

Views of the Conflict: Pro-Arab
 Washington Report on Mideast Affairs, published by the American Educational Trust, Inc.
 Jews Against the Occupation, an American activist organization
 Gush Shalom, the Bloc of the Peaceful, an Israeli peace organization founded by Uri Avnery
 If Americans Only Knew, American organization founded by freelance journalists.
 Break The Silence, Diaries, Articles, and Photos of the People affected by the war

Jews in Arab countries
 A Book review (English): "Une si longue présence, Comment le monde arabe a perdu ses Juifs, 1947-1967" 2008, by Nathan Weinstock. (and a Hebrew review)

Arab–Israeli conflict